Prato Carnico (locally ) is a comune (municipality) in the Province of Udine in the Italian region Friuli-Venezia Giulia, located about  northwest of Trieste and about  northwest of Udine.

Prato Carnico borders the following municipalities: Comeglians, Forni Avoltri, Ovaro, Rigolato, Sappada, Sauris, Vigo di Cadore.

Demographic evolution

References

Cities and towns in Friuli-Venezia Giulia